Bak Tongsa is a textbook of colloquial northern Chinese published by the Bureau of Interpreters in Korea in various editions between the 14th and 18th centuries. Like the contemporaneous Nogeoldae ('Old Cathayan'), it is an important source on both Late Middle Korean and the history of Mandarin Chinese. The Nogeoldae consists of dialogues and focuses on travelling merchants, but Bak Tongsa is a narrative text covering society and culture.

Editions 
The original Chinese text was written in the mid-14th century, but it is no longer extant.
The Bak Tongsa and the Nogeoldae were very popular, and are mentioned in Korean records of 1426 as required texts for government translators.

In 1480, the royal instructor ordered revisions of both textbooks to match the very different Middle Mandarin of the Ming dynasty. In 1517, the Korean scholar Choe Sejin augmented this edition with Chinese pronunciations written in Hangul and a Korean translation. This edition is now conventionally called the Beonyeok Bak Tongsa (飜譯朴通事 New Translation of Pak the Interpreter) to distinguish it from the original. This edition was believed to have been lost during the Manchu invasions of Korea, but one volume was rediscovered in the 1950s.
The Korean version is written in a colloquial style, giving unique insight into Late Middle Korean.

The Bak Tongsa eonhae (朴通事諺解 Vernacular Exposition of Pak the Interpreter) was published in 1677. Prepared when the earlier Beonyeok Bak Tongsa was believed lost, this edition was based on Choe Se-jin's No-Bak Jimnam (老朴集覽  Glossary of the No[geoldae] and Bak [Tongsa]).. The Chinese text is identical with that of the Beonyeok Bak Tongsa, but the pronunciations and the Korean translation were completely revised.

Bak Tongsa Sinseok eonhae (朴通事新釋諺解 New Edition Vernacular Exposition of Pak the Interpreter), a further revision by Kim Chang-jo, was published in 1765.

References 

Works cited

Further reading

External links 

 
 Bak Tongsa Sinseok eonhae at the Internet Archive: vol. 1, vol. 2
 Joseon dynasty texts at the Academy of Korean Studies, including Bak Tongsa eonhae and Bak Tongsa Sinseok eonhae.

Chinese-language education
Korean language
Old Mandarin
14th-century books